A gibeciere is a large pouch-like device used by magicians as a utility device, most often to aid in the performance of the famous magic trick known as "The Cups and Balls".  In modern times, it is often used by street magicians due to its ability to hold large items (frequently referred to as "loads" within performing circles) such as fruits, various balls and sometimes stuffed or even real animals.
It is commonly held around the performer's waist by a belt, in plain sight, and the pouch commonly rests along the front of the body, just below the waistline.

References 

Sleight of hand
Magic (illusion)